Remo Camerota (born on 17 April in Coventry, England), is an English-Australian visual artist and film director. He has been exhibiting in the arts since 1992, when he also started a fine art degree at Swinburne University, Melbourne.

In1992 and 1993, he won the VEVA award for animation and the St Kilda Film Festival facility award (See awards below for more details). He also completed his bachelor's degree in film and television at Victorian College of the Arts - 1995.

From 1996 to 1998, Camerota worked as a director and editor of Foxtel/Sportsworld - on the TV show Extreme Sports.
Camerota's style of editing and directing became popular in youth culture TV shows, using techniques such as fast cutting, SFX and juxtaposition of sound with image.

From 1994 to 2000, Camerota continued to exhibit video, painting and photography installations including  "Trade", at the world trade centre Melbourne, titled "Loophole" consisting of a wall of television sets creating a visual and sound loop through the use of feedback, Neo Ethnic at MYU Gallery Tokyo comprising stencil paintings, video-photography installations at Experimenta and collaborating with artist "Stelarc" in his short film Scar.
From 2000 to 2003, Camerota edited feature film Narcosys and video directed, photographed and edited "Speaking in Tongues" DVD, Gene Simmons.
In 2003, Camerota started a production company - Whitewall Studios 

2003 Camerota directed the Kiss Symphony tour DVD extras and B roll.  Also Camerota's photographs became published first in magazines and also included in Kiss Alive 4 package, Kiss and Make up Book and Speaking in Tongues DVD.

Camerota co0founds Raven  with Kumicho and is currently creating the Manga graphic novel for the Horror feature film SCAR and Sci Fi feature Origami Moon.

2008–2010 Camerota authored two books featuring Japanese pop culture, titled Graffiti Japan and Drainspotting http://drainspottingbook.blogspot.com, both are published by Mark Batty Publisher New York .

Remo has book signing tours throughout USA and Tokyo in 2008–2011.

2005–2011 urban painting and photography exhibited at galleries in New York, london, Bristol, Tokyo, Sydney and murals painted at Bristol in collaboration with Kid zoom and Rory Doona, Cargo Club London UK, Bondi Beach facade Sydney, Shibuya Tokyo, Revolt Club Melbourne.

2010–2011 - Camerota is creating iPad/iPhone apps in conjunction with his authored books. Titles so far are Drainspotting Extras, Graffiti Japan Extras, Graffiti New York, Graphic Novel - Scar Vol 1 and 2.
2011 - Camerota teamed up with Kiyoshi Kohatsu and created Kit Robot - LoveBots iPad/iPhone app, an avatar maker of robots. www.kit-robot.com

References

 Graffiti Japan in Tokyo  http://www.cnngo.com/tokyo/cnngo-tv-venturing-hidden-parts-tokyo-302365
 Wired Magazine https://www.wired.co.uk/news/archive/2010-05/10/drainspotting-book-examines-japans-artistic-manholes
 Graffiti in Bristol http://markbattypublisher.com/blog/news/remo-camerota-makes-walls-pretty-in-bristol-uk/
 Graffiti Japan Book http://markbattypublisher.com/books/graffiti-japan/
 Drainspotting Book http://markbattypublisher.com/books/drainspotting-book/
 Drainspotting TV Asahi http://markbattypublisher.com/blog/news/drainspotting-on-tv-asahis-wide-scramble/
 Marie Claire http://www.marieclaire.it/Magazine/ricreazione/Drainspotting
 Cool Hunting http://www.coolhunting.com/travel/drainspotting.php
 Boing Boing http://www.boingboing.net/2010/05/24/drainspotting-a-book.html
 Boing Boing http://www.boingboing.net/2010/12/21/-lovebots-by-kit-rob.html
 CnnGo http://www.cnngo.com/tokyo/play/tokyo-graffiti-brightening-walls-223761
 Melbourne independent film makers http://www.innersense.com.au/mif/camerota.html
 Kiss Symphony http://www.cduniverse.com/search/xx/music/pid/6348171/a/Symphony%3A+Alive+IV%3A+The+Single+Disc.htm
 Gene Simmons Speaking in Tongues https://web.archive.org/web/20111205215806/http://music.msn.com/music/album/gene-simmons/speaking-in-tongues.1/

External links
 

People from Coventry
English film editors
Living people
Year of birth missing (living people)